Irati Santiago Mujika (born January 16, 1991) is a music video producer, TV producer and film producer from Villabona, Spain. She has been professionally producing music videos, short films and feature films since 2016. Irati’s most notable collaborations are with Steve Aoki, Paris Hilton and will.i.am.

Early life and career 
Irati was raised in Villabona, Spain; Irati was first exposed to video production when a school teacher showed her the work of Irving Thalberg. When Irati was 11 years old her parents bought her a video camera and she began making short films with her sister. In 2011 Irati spent her sophomore year of college at Wright State University in Dayton, Ohio. While at Wright State she received a scholarship to travel to Charlotte, North Carolina to produce a documentary with marine biology professors at Duke University. Irati graduated from Columbia College Chicago in 2017 in Chicago, Illinois with a Masters of Fine Arts. After graduating Irati began producing music videos with Juicy M, Cheat Codes, Afrojack and Tritonal. Irati filmed Aberne in 2017; the film was recorded in Basque Country, marking Irati’s first international production.

After Aberne, Irati moved to Los Angeles, California in 2017 to pursue her career in video production.  Currently Irati is working as a film producer and recently produced her first two feature films in 2019.

Filmography

Feature films

Television

Music videos

Short films

References

External links 

1991 births
Living people
Music video producers